Quintus Asconius Pedianus (BC 9 - AD 76) was a Roman historian. There is no evidence that Asconius engaged in a public career, but he was familiar both with Roman government of his time and with the geography of the city. He may, therefore, have written much of his works in the city.

During the reigns of Claudius and Nero he compiled for his two sons, from various sources – e.g. the Gazette (acta publica), shorthand reports or skeletons (commentarii) of Cicero's unpublished speeches, Tiro's life of Cicero, speeches and letters of Cicero's contemporaries, various historical writers, e.g. Varro, Atticus, Antias, Tuditanus and Fenestella (a contemporary of Livy whom he often criticizes) – historical commentaries on Cicero's speeches, of which only five survive: in Pisonem, pro Scauro, pro Milone, pro Cornelio de maiestate, and in toga candida.

Other works attributed to Asconius include a Vita Sallustii, a work referenced in Pliny's Naturalis Historiae, and contra Vergilii obtrectatores. 

In a note upon the speech pro Scauro, he speaks of Longus Caecina (died AD 57) as still living, while his words imply that Claudius (died AD 54) was not alive. This statement, therefore, must have been written between AD 54 and 57. These valuable notes, written in good Latin, relate chiefly to historical and antiquarian matters. A grammatically commentary on Cicero's Verrines was transmitted alongside Asconius' main commentaries but has been shown to be a 5th century work. 

Both works were found by Poggio in a manuscript at St Gallen in 1416. This manuscript is lost, but three transcripts were made by Poggio, Zomini (Sozomenus) of Pistoia and Bartolommeo da Montepulciano. That of Poggio is now at Madrid (Matritensis X. 81), and that of Zomini is in the Forteguerri library at Pistoia (No. 37). A copy of Bartolommeo's transcript exists in Florence (Laur. 5). The later manuscripts are derived from Poggio's copy.

Other works attributed to Asconius were:
a life of Sallust
a defence of Virgil against his detractors
a treatise (perhaps a symposium in imitation of Plato) on health and long life.

Editions 
 Kiessling and Scholl (1875)
 Albert Curtis Clark (Oxford, 1907), contains a previously unpublished collation of Poggio's manuscript.
 Asconius online on Attalus.org

References
 Citations

 Sources

Further reading 
  
 
 

0s BC births
76 deaths
Grammarians of Latin
Latin historians
1st-century Romans
1st-century historians
9 BC births
1st-century Latin writers